is a Japanese photographer.

Books by Ina
Yōroppa toire hakubutsushi. Tokyo: Inax, 1988. . Tokyo: Inax, 1990. . Text by Hiroshi Unno and others.
Nihon toire hakubutsushi. Tokyo: Inax, 1990. . Text by Kaoru Agi and others. 
Nihon tairu hakubutsushi. Dai-san kūkan sensho. Tokyo: Inax, 1991. . Text by Kaoru Agi and others.
Toshi kūkan no kansei. Tokyo: TBS Britannica, 1992. . Ed..
Eki dezain to paburikku āto: Ōedo-sen 26-eki shashinsū. Tokyo: Tōkyō Chikatetsu Sekkei, 2000.
Toshi fūkei no mekanizumu: Ina Eiji Kanemura Osamu no shashin Tenran / Inside Out: Mechanism of Cityscapes. Ryūdō suru bijutsu, 8. Fukuoka: Fukuoka-shi Bijutsukan, 2003. With Osamu Kanemura.
Waste. Tucson, Az.: Nazraeli, 1998. .
Emperor of Japan. Portland, Or.: Nazraeli, 2008. .
Wacht. Portland, Or.: Nazraeli, 2010. .

References

Japanese photographers
1957 births
Living people
Place of birth missing (living people)
Tokyo College of Photography alumni